In mathematics, in the field of additive combinatorics, a Gowers norm or uniformity norm is a class of norms on functions on a finite group or group-like object which quantify the amount of structure present, or conversely, the amount of randomness. They are used in the study of arithmetic progressions in the group.  They are named after Timothy Gowers, who introduced it in his work on Szemerédi's theorem.

Definition 

Let  be a complex-valued function on a finite abelian group  and let  denote complex conjugation.  The Gowers -norm is

Gowers norms are also defined for complex-valued functions f on a segment , where N is a positive integer.

Inverse conjectures 

An inverse conjecture for these norms is a statement asserting that if a bounded function f has a large Gowers d-norm then f correlates with a polynomial phase of degree d − 1 or other object with polynomial behaviour (e.g. a (d − 1)-step nilsequence). The precise statement depends on the Gowers norm under consideration.

where . This conjecture was proved to be true by Bergelson, Tao, and Ziegler.

The Inverse Conjecture for Gowers  norm asserts that for any , a finite collection of (d − 1)-step nilmanifolds  and constants  can be found, so that the following is true.

This conjecture was proved to be true by Green, Tao, and Ziegler. It should be stressed that the appearance of nilsequences in the above statement is necessary. The statement is no longer true if we only consider polynomial phases.

References

 

Additive combinatorics